Kai Simon Edwards (born 10 August 1997) is a Dutch basketball player who plays for Club Melilla Baloncesto of the LEB Oro. Born in Amsterdam, he played college basketball with the Northern Colorado. He continued his career in Spain.

Early career
Born in Amsterdam, Edwards started playing basketball at age 16. He started his club career in the youth section of Apollo Amsterdam. Edwards played for the Canarias Basketball Academy, a Spanish academy located at the Canary Islands.

College career
Edwards received scholarship offers from three universities, and eventually committed to Northern Colorado.

Professional career
Edwards started his career in August 2020, when he signed a one-year contract with  Bahía San Agustín in the Spanish LEB Oro.

After playing the pre-season with Bahía San Augstín, Edwards signed with another LEB Oro team in Castelló, where he averaged 7 points and 4.7 rebounds in his rookie season. On 13 July 2021, Edwards extended his contract for another season averaging 6 points and 5 rebounds. On 18 July 2022, he signs for Club Melilla Baloncesto.

National team career
In July 2021, Edwards joined the training camp of the Netherlands senior team for the first time, along with his brother Jesse.

Career statistics

College

|-
| 2016–17 || Northern Colorado || 29 || 11 || 16.2 || .682 || .000 || .360 || 5.1 || 0.3 || 0.3 || 0.1 || 4.6
|-
| 2017–18 || Northern Colorado || 29 || 1 || 7.0 || .722 || .000 || .379 || 2.1 || 0.2 || 0.1 || 0.2 || 2.2
|-
| 2018–19 || Northern Colorado || 32 || 16 || 20.1 || .760 || .000 || .537 || 5.7 || 0.7 || 0.3 || 0.3 || 5.3
|-
| 2019–20 || Northern Colorado || 31 || 0 || 22.2 || .648 || .000 || .596 || 7.1 || 0.8 || 0.4 || 0.4 || 9.4
|-
| colspan=2 align=center | Career || 121 || 28 || 16.6 || .689 || .000 || .502 || 5.1 || 0.5 || 0.3 || 0.2 || 5.4

Personal
His younger brother Jesse also plays basketball, and currently plays college basketball for Syracuse.

At the University of Northern Colorado, he majored in business marketing.

References

External links
Kai Edwards at RealGM

1997 births
Living people
Sportspeople from Amsterdam
Northern Colorado Bears men's basketball players
Dutch men's basketball players
Power forwards (basketball)
Club Melilla Baloncesto players